In monetary economics, inside money is money issued by private intermediaries (i.e. commercial banks) in the form of debt (credit). This money is typically in the form of demand deposits or other deposits, and hence is part of the money supply. The money, which is an asset of the depositor but coincides with a liability of the bank, is inside money.

Inside money is thus a liability (equivalently a negative asset) to the issuer, so the net amount of assets associated with inside money in an economy is zero. Most money circulating in a modern economy is inside money.

References

See also

 Outside money
 Mutual credit

Monetary economics